The Greenes are an American Southern gospel trio from the Boone, North Carolina, and they started making music together in 1978. They have released numerous studio albums with various labels.

Background
The trio formed Boone, North Carolina during 1979, by the father of the Greene children, Everette Ralph Greene, with his three children, the eldest brother, Timothy Everette "Tim" Greene, the middle sister, Kimberly Ellen Greene, and their youngest brother, Anthony Elden "Tony" Greene. Their father played the piano as the group toured, playing at churches and other venues. Their sister would wed Claude Dean Hopper of The Hoppers, and would leave the trio 1988. After this time, the two brothers found Amy Lambert and Milena Parks to fill the soprano role in their group at various times. Until 1997, TaRanda Kiser joined the group fresh out of high school, after a successful audition. The group lost their founder, Everette Ralph Greene, in 2004. The younger brother, Tony Greene, died in 2010 of pneumonia, who was the husband of TaRanda Greene, having wed in February 2001. Soon thereafter, TaRanda left the group to start her full-time solo music ministry, and she is now with Cana's Voice. The three current members of the group are the eldest brother, Tim Greene, and Connor Bost and Keith Skiles.

Music history
The trio has released numerous studio albums with Riversong Records, New Haven Records, Crossroads Records, Aca Digital Records.

Members
Current members
 Tim Greene (Lead)
 Connor Bost (Baritone)
 Keith Skiles (Tenor)

Former members
 Everette Greene 
 Kim Greene Hopper
 Tony Greene
 TaRanda Greene (born April 6, 1979)
 Amy Lambert
 Milena Parks
 Brad Hudson
 John Jeffrey 
 Jeff Snyder
 Tony Goforth

Discography
Studio albums
 It's a Sweet Life (1993)
 Safe in Christ (1994)
 Momma's Heart (1995)
 And The Walls Came Down (1996)
 Jesus Rocking Chair (1996)
 The Road Home (1997)
 A Special Time (1998)
 Wonderful Story (1999)
 So Happy (2000)
 Glory Mountain (2001)
 Glimpse of Glory (2003)
 God Is a Good Good (2006)
 Whosoever Believes (2006)
 Christ Is Born (2006)
 Hallelujah (2010) 
 We Need America Again (2012)
 Sweet Freedom (2013)
 Legacy (2014)
 Blessing (2017)

References

External links

American Christian musical groups
Family musical groups
Musical groups established in 1978
Musical groups from North Carolina
Southern gospel performers
Vocal trios